Oulu is a Finnish constituency represented in eduskunta. It covers the administrative regions of Northern Ostrobothnia and Kainuu, with a combined population of about 459,000. Oulu currently elects 18 members of eduskunta.

The constituency is largely rural, and the major cities are Oulu and Kajaani. The dominant party is the Centre, which has taken half of the available seats since 1991.

Members of parliament

2007–2011
 Matti Ahde (Social Democratic Party)
 Tuomo Hänninen Centre Party)
 Liisa Jaakonsaari (Social Democratic Party)
 Kyösti Karjula (Centre Party)
 Inkeri Kerola (Centre Party)
 Martti Korhonen (Left Alliance)
 Timo Korhonen (Centre Party)
 Merja Kyllönen (Left Alliance)
 Paula Lehtomäki (Centre Party)
 Suvi Lindén (National Coalition Party)
 Erkki Pulliainen (Green League)
 Lyly Rajala (National Coalition Party)
 Antti Rantakangas (Centre Party)
 Tapani Tölli (Centre Party)
 Tuulikki Ukkola (National Coalition Party)
 Unto Valpas (Left Alliance)
 Mirja Vehkaperä (Centre Party)
 Pekka Vilkuna (Centre Party)

2019–2023
 Pekka Aittakumpu (Centre Party)
 Janne Heikkinen (National Coalition Party)
 Katja Hänninen (Left Alliance)
 Olli Immonen (Finns Party)
 Mikko Kinnunen (Centre Party)
 Merja Kyllönen (Left Alliance)
 Hanna-Leena Mattila (Centre Party)
 Raimo Piirainen (Social Democratic Party)
 Jenni Pitko (Green League)
 Juha Pylväs (Centre Party)
 Antti Rantakangas (Centre Party)
 Hanna Sarkkinen (Left Alliance)
 Jenna Simula (Finns Party)
 Juha Sipilä (Centre Party)
 Mari-Leena Talvitie (National Coalition Party)
 Tytti Tuppurainen (Social Democratic Party)
 Sebastian Tynkkynen (Finns Party)
 Ville Vähämäki (Finns Party)

Election results

|}

|}

|}

|}

|}

References

See also
 Constituencies of Finland

Parliament of Finland electoral districts
Kainuu
North Ostrobothnia